Ancylotrypa is a genus of African wafer trapdoor spiders that was first described by Eugène Simon in 1889. Originally placed with the Ctenizidae, it was moved to the Cyrtaucheniidae in 1953.

Species
 it contains 43 species:
Ancylotrypa angulata Roewer, 1953 – Congo
Ancylotrypa atra Strand, 1906 – Ethiopia, Kenya
Ancylotrypa barbertoni (Hewitt, 1913) – South Africa
Ancylotrypa bicornuta Strand, 1906 – South Africa
Ancylotrypa brevicornis (Hewitt, 1919) – South Africa
Ancylotrypa brevipalpis (Hewitt, 1916) – South Africa
Ancylotrypa brevipes (Karsch, 1879) – West Africa
Ancylotrypa breyeri (Hewitt, 1919) – South Africa
Ancylotrypa bulcocki (Hewitt, 1916) – South Africa
Ancylotrypa coloniae (Pocock, 1902) – South Africa
Ancylotrypa cornuta Purcell, 1904 – South Africa
Ancylotrypa decorata (Lessert, 1938) – Congo
Ancylotrypa dentata (Purcell, 1903) – South Africa
Ancylotrypa dreyeri (Hewitt, 1915) – South Africa
Ancylotrypa elongata Purcell, 1908 – Botswana
Ancylotrypa fasciata Fage, 1936 – Kenya
Ancylotrypa flaviceps (Pocock, 1898) – East Africa
Ancylotrypa flavidofusula (Hewitt, 1915) – South Africa
Ancylotrypa fodiens (Thorell, 1899) – Cameroon
Ancylotrypa fossor Simon, 1889 (type) – Central Africa
Ancylotrypa granulata (Hewitt, 1935) – Botswana
Ancylotrypa kankundana Roewer, 1953 – Congo
Ancylotrypa kateka (Roewer, 1953) – Congo
Ancylotrypa lateralis (Purcell, 1902) – South Africa
Ancylotrypa magnisigillata (Hewitt, 1914) – South Africa
Ancylotrypa namaquensis (Purcell, 1908) – South Africa
Ancylotrypa nigriceps (Purcell, 1902) – South Africa
Ancylotrypa nuda (Hewitt, 1916) – South Africa
Ancylotrypa nudipes (Hewitt, 1923) – South Africa
Ancylotrypa oneili (Purcell, 1902) – South Africa
Ancylotrypa pallidipes (Purcell, 1904) – South Africa
Ancylotrypa parva (Hewitt, 1916) – South Africa
Ancylotrypa pretoriae (Hewitt, 1913) – South Africa
Ancylotrypa pusilla Purcell, 1903 – South Africa
Ancylotrypa rufescens (Hewitt, 1916) – South Africa
Ancylotrypa schultzei (Purcell, 1908) – Namibia
Ancylotrypa sororum (Hewitt, 1916) – South Africa
Ancylotrypa spinosa Simon, 1889 – South Africa
Ancylotrypa tookei (Hewitt, 1919) – South Africa
Ancylotrypa tuckeri Roewer, 1953 – Congo
Ancylotrypa vryheidensis (Hewitt, 1915) – South Africa
Ancylotrypa zebra (Simon, 1892) – South Africa
Ancylotrypa zeltneri (Simon, 1904) – Ethiopia
Ancylotrypa zuluensis (Lawrence, 1937) – South Africa

References

Cyrtaucheniidae
Mygalomorphae genera
Spiders of Africa
Taxa named by Eugène Simon